State Route 293 (SR 293) is a  route that serves as a connection between SR 126 east of Mount Meigs and SR 110 north of McDade in eastern Montgomery County. It parallels the future Montgomery Bypass, SR 108 for its entire length.

Route description
The southern terminus of SR 293 is located at its intersection with SR 110 north of McDade. From this point, the route generally travels in a northerly direction before terminating at SR 126 east of Mount Meigs, just south of I-85.

Major intersections

References

293
Transportation in Montgomery County, Alabama